Benny Omer has been the Israeli Ambassador to Nepal since 2017 and from 1998 until 1999.  From 2009 until 2013, and previously in 2001, Omer was ambassador to the Côte d’Ivoire and from 2003 until 2007, Cameroon.

References

Ambassadors of Israel to Nepal
Ambassadors of Israel to Ivory Coast
Ambassadors of Israel to Cameroon
Year of birth missing (living people)
Living people